David Oluwafemi Adewunmi Abdulateef Fani-Kayode (born 16 October 1960) is a Nigerian politician, essayist, poet and lawyer.  He was a member of the ruling Peoples Democratic Party (PDP). He was with the opposition's All Progressive Congress (APC) until June 2014 when he returned to the ruling Peoples Democratic Party and Although his family lineage originates from Osun, he was born in Lagos, on 16 October 1960 to Chief Remi Fani-Kayode and to Chief (Mrs) Adia Adunni Fani-Kayode. He is an Ile-Ife chieftain of Yoruba descent.

Fani-Kayode was the Special Assistant (Public Affairs) to President Olusegun Obasanjo from July 2003 until June 2006. He was appointed the Minister of Culture and Tourism of the Federal Republic of Nigeria from 22 June to 7 November 2006 and as the Minister of Aviation from 7 November 2006 to 29 May 2007.

Background and education
His great-grandfather, the Rev. Emmanuel Adedapo Kayode, was one of the earliest Nigerians to be educated in England, receiving an MA from the University of Durham, after which he became an Anglican priest.  His grandfather, Victor Adedapo Kayode, studied law at Cambridge University and became a lawyer and a judge. His father Victor Babaremilekun Adetokunboh Fani-Kayode, who was also at Cambridge was a prominent lawyer and political figure in Nigeria in the 1950s and 1960s.  He was Leader of the National Council of Nigeria and the Cameroons Opposition in the Western House of Assembly from 1960 to 1963, the Hon. Minister of Local Government and Chieftaincy Affairs and Deputy Premier of the Western Region of Nigeria from 1963 until 1966 and he successfully moved the motion for Nigeria's independence in 1958 in the Nigerian Parliament.

Femi Fani-Kayode started his education at the age of eight at Brighton College, Brighton in the UK after which he went to Holmewood House School in Tunbridge Wells, Kent, South-East England. He entered Harrow School in Harrow on the Hill, United Kingdom and later into Kelly College in Tavistock, UK, where he completed the rest of his public school education. In 1980 Femi Fani-Kayode went to the University of London, School of Oriental and African Studies where he graduated with an LL.B law degree in 1983. He entered Cambridge University (Pembroke College) where his grandfather (Selwyn College), his father (Downing College) and his older brother, Akinola (Downing College) had all previously read law. Victor Adedapo Kayode, Femi's grandfather, was called to the British bar (Middle Temple) in 1922 and his father, Remi Fani-Kayode, was called to the British bar (Middle Temple) in 1945. After finishing from Cambridge, Femi Fani-Kayode went to the Nigerian Law School and in 1985 was called to the Nigerian Bar. In 1993, under the tutelage of Archbishop Nicholas Duncan-Williams of Ghana, Femi Fani-Kayode became a Pentecostal Christian. He decided to go back to school to study theology at the Christian Action Faith Bible Seminary in Accra, Ghana, gaining a diploma in theology in 1995.

Political career
Femi Fani-Kayode was a member of the Nigerian National Congress (NNC) in 1989. He was elected the national youth leader of NNC that same year. In 1990, he was appointed as Chief Press Secretary to Chief Tom Ikimi, the first national chairman of the National Republican Convention (NRC) and in 1991 as Special Assistant to Alhaji Umaru Shinkafi, former head of the Nigerian Security Organisation (NSO). In 1996, disturbed by the actions of Gen. Sani Abacha's military junta, Femi Fani-Kayode left Nigeria and joined the National Democratic Coalition (NADECO) abroad where, together with the likes of the Oxford University-trained lawyer Chief Tunde Edu and others, he played a very active role in the fight against Abacha. He came back to Nigeria in 2001 and met President Olusegun Obasanjo. At the beginning of 2003, Femi Fani-Kayode was appointed by the President as a member of his presidential campaign team for the 2003 presidential election. After President Obasanjo won that election, Femi Fani-Kayode was appointed as the first ever Special Assistant on Public Affairs to the President of the Federal Republic of Nigeria. In 2006, he was appointed as the Honorable Minister of Culture and Tourism. That same year, after a minor cabinet reshuffle, he was redeployed to the Aviation Ministry as the Honourable Minister of Aviation. Since the end of the tenure of President Olusegun Obasanjo's administration on 29 May 2007, Femi Fani-Kayode has gone back to the private sector and to his legal practice.

Challenges and allegations
Femi Fani-Kayode was investigated and arrested by the Economic and Financial Crimes Commission (EFCC) in July 2008 in connection with the alleged misappropriation of a 19.5 billion naira (approx.US$300,000,000) "Aviation Intervention Fund."  The investigation found no evidence against him. The Senate Committee on Aviation in early 2008, initially recommended that Fani-Kayode be banned from holding public office for five years but withdrew the request when he had not violated any law.

At the beginning of 2010,  there was speculation that a power struggle had begun in Nigeria with President Obasanjo and his loyalists pushing for Yar'Adua to step down and hand over power to his vice-president, Dr. Goodluck Jonathan. Yar'Adua's loyalists resisted this suggestion and part of their response to that challenge was to implement another strategy to try to silence and intimidate President Obasanjo and his key loyalists like El-Rufai, Fani-Kayode, Ribadu, Lawal Batagarawa, Nnenadi Usman and Andy Uba by accusing them of plotting a coup. This was the same method that was adopted by General Sani Abacha who had jailed Obasanjo on similar charges when he was in power. General Obasanjo was released and pardoned a number of years later after Abacha died and after General Abdulsalami Abubakar took power.

In November 2010, Fani-Kayode said that Yar'Adua's sought to jail and destroy his predecessor in office and the man that single-handedly brought him to power, President Olusegun Obasanjo, as well as his loyalists, including El-Rufai, Ribadu, and Fani-Kayode himself. He also alleged that Baba Gana Kingibe, the Secretary to the Federal Government during the Yar'Adua administration, was the principal enforcer of that plan and that Yar'Adua administration officials James Ibori, Tanimu Yakubu, Abba Ruma and Michael Aondoakaa were also involved.

On 25 August 2020, while attending a brief press conference during his tour of Southern Nigeria, he insulted and denigrated a journalist from Daily Trust a subsidiary of media trust. The journalist had allegedly said “we don't know who is bankrolling you” and this had set FFK off on a tirade of words. Press houses as well as Nigerians on Twitter and other social networks expressed great displeasure at his barrage of insults taking into context the fact that he was a lawyer and could have exhibited more decorum. On 26 August 2020, he issued an apology to the journalist which has since been considered to be half-hearted and insincere on his part.

Arrested by EFCC
Fani-Kayode was arrested in December 2008 by the EFCC and charged with 47 counts of money laundering.  Fani-Kayode stated that he was innocent and that the monies were funds received from his own private businesses and legitimate sources and had nothing to do with government funds. He said that the investigations of the Yar'Adua government and the EFCC were politically motivated, and he was being persecuted in the same way as other colleagues from the Obasanjo government, such as Nasir Ahmad el-Rufai and Nuhu Ribadu, for their ties to President Obasanjo. On 22 October, EFCC operatives of arrested on a 17-count charge of unlawful retention, unlawful use and unlawful payment of money in the tune of about N4.9 billion, a charge brought against them by the anti-graft commission.

Fani-Kayode discharged and acquitted of money laundering charges
Mr Femi Fani-Kayode, was discharged and acquitted on 1 July by a Federal High Court sitting in Lagos on the two count charge of money laundering preferred against him by the Economic and Financial Crimes Commission, EFCC. The court held that the EFCC was unable to prove the charges against Fani-Kayode beyond reasonable doubt and consequently acquitted him.

In his victory press statement Fani-Kayode changed his name from. Oluwafemi Fani-Kayode to Olufemi Olu-Kayode (meaning the Lord brings joy). According to him this was done as a mark of gratitude to God following his acquittal of all the remaining money laundering charges that were brought against him by the EFCC. Fani-Kayode had fought the case since 1 July 2008 and he was finally cleared of all the remaining charges that had not been dismissed earlier on 1 July 2015. This was 7 years to the day after his ordeal first started.

Kayode had fought the case since 2008 was accused by the EFCC to have laundered about N100m while he was Minister of Culture and Tourism and subsequently Aviation Minister. The allegedly laundered sum was however reduced to N2.1m on 17 November 2014 after Justice Ofili-Ajumogobia, dismissed 38 out of the 40 counts levelled against Fani-Kayode by the EFCC for want of proof.

Poems and essays
In November 2009, before Yar'Adua fell ill, Fani-Kayode wrote a poem titled "I Stand and I Fight". In this poem, he described Yar'Adua as a "sickly tyrant with an amalekite foundation" and he predicted that "his end would soon come". Fani-Kayode wrote other poems over the last few years.

In January 2010 and approximately two months after Yar'Adua left Nigeria and was flown to Saudi Arabia on medical grounds (during which time no Nigerian other than his wife and his chief security officer saw him or saw any pictures of him), there were strong speculations in the country that the president was dead, was in a deep coma or was simply so sick that he could not even speak or get up from his sick bed in his Saudi Arabian hospital. This resulted in a power vacuum in Nigeria as a consequence of which a constitutional crisis began to unfold. The President's supporters and cabinet ministers, led by his wife Turai Yar'Adua, resisted the suggestion that the vice-president should take over power whilst the President was incapacitated even though this was what the Nigerian constitution prescribed, Fani-Kayode added his voice to that of President Obasanjo, President Shehu Shagari, General Yakubu Gowon, Ernest Shonekan and other former heads of government, former cabinet ministers, former legislators, leading opposition figures and leading members of the ruling PDP party by publicly calling for the resignation of President Yaradua and for the transference of power to Vice-president Goodluck Jonathan at that critical time. To convey his view Fani-Kayode wrote a satire in Next Newspaper  and titled it "Corpsology: Umaru's Gift To The Modern World".  In the article Fani-Kayode suggested that by insisting on ruling Nigeria from his sick bed in Saudi Arabia and through his acolytes and wife, the President and his supporters were not just breaching the Nigerian constitution but that they were also surreptitiously introducing an entirely new and alien system of government into Nigeria, destroying democracy and attempting to perpetuate themselves in power through that new system indefinitely.  He argued that this was being done by the authorities even where it was clear that the President was already "half dead". Fani-Kayode defined his concept of corpsology (or "corpsocracy" as he sometimes calls it) as "the rulership of the living by the dead" and the thrust and intent of his satire was to clearly convey the message that the attempt to introduce this hitherto unknown system of government into Nigeria by Yaradua, his wife and his kitchen cabinet was unacceptable and must not be allowed to stand.

 On 7 August 2010 Fani-Kayode wrote another article titled "Charles Taylor: A Man Betrayed" in which he described the events and circumstances leading up to the extradition of the infamous former President of Liberia Charles Taylor from Nigeria, where he had been given refuge and asylum after a bitter war and crisis in his nation Liberia. Fani-Kayode explained how Taylor ended up being handed back to Liberia and how he was then sent to the International Criminal Court at The Hague in the Netherlands to face charges of genocide and crimes against humanity. Fani-Kayode had been the spokesman of President Obasanjo at that time, and in his essay he gave an account of how Taylor was betrayed by a number of parties and nations and detailed what he described as the "treacherous and ignoble" roles that US President George W. Bush and President Johnson Sirleaf of Liberia played in the saga. He accused both America and Liberia of reneging on their word and on an earlier agreement on the Taylor issue and he alleged that they "betrayed the confidence" that the African Union, the Economic Community of West African States (ECOWAS) Heads of Government, Nigeria and President Obasanjo had placed in them. Finally he called for the trial of former President George W. Bush and Britain's former Prime Minister Tony Blair at the same International Criminal Court at The Hague for what he described as "similar crimes against humanity" as the ones that Taylor was being accused of. He alleged that they had committed these crimes during the illegal invasion of Iraq and the bombing of Baghdad in which he claimed that "hundreds of thousands of defenceless and innocent Iraqi women and children" were killed. The article was published the day after the sensational appearance of super-model Naomi Campbell at the famous "blood diamonds" trial of Charles Taylor at The Hague.

Fani-Kayode was also involved in a debate about the mysterious circumstances under which Nigeria's first Prime Minister, Sir Tafawa Balewa, lost his life. In two essays titled "Femi Fani-Kayode: Who Killed Sir Tafawa Balewa?" and "The Death of Tafawa Balewa: the Segun Osoba angle", he opposed the view that Balewa had died of natural causes, which had been suggested by Chief M.T. Mbu, Nigeria's former Foreign Minister and Chief Segun Osoba, a former state governor, and he proffered the view that the Prime Minister had actually been murdered. Fani-Kayode wrote other essays over the years. In 2011 he called for the "crushing" of the Islamic fundamentalist sect called Boko Haram which claimed responsibility for the deaths of hundreds of Nigerians in a campaign of terror and bombing in their quest to ban western education and set up an Islamic fundamentalist caliphate in the whole of northern Nigeria".

Family
Femi Fani-Kayode has been married four times. His first marriage was to Saratu "Baby" Atta in 1987 and they were divorced by 1990. They have one daughter whose name is Oluwafolake. The second marriage was to Yemisi Olasunbo Adeniji in 1991 but they were divorced by 1995. They have three daughters whose names are Oluwatemitope, Oluwatobiloba and Oluwatuminu. The third marriage was to Regina-Hanson Amonoo. They were married in 1997 and have one daughter, whose name is Oluwaremilekun. In 2014 Femi Fani-Kayode and Precious Chikwendu,  a beauty queen and the winner of the Miss United  Nations (world) beauty pageant 2014, got married. This was his fourth marriage. On 1 February 2016 Fani-Kayode and his wife had their first son. He was christened Joshua Oluwafemi Emmanuel Lotanna Aragorn Fani-Kayode. He is Fani-Kayode's first son. On 25 May 2018 Precious Chikwendu Fani-Kayode gave birth to three boys.  Their names are:

1. Ragnar, Alexander, Okunade, Olusegun, Ikenna Fani-Kayode

2. Aiden, Daniel, Olumide,  Jidenna, Benaniah Fani-Kayode

3. Liam, Michael, Oluwanifemi, Tobenna, Jehu Fani-Kayode

The birth of the triplets was made all the more auspicious by the fact that they were delivered on their mother's birthday.

Femi Fani-Kayode's older brother, Rotimi Fani-Kayode, was a renowned and influential artist and photographer who founded the Association of Black Photographers (Autograph) and who died in 1989 due to complications from HIV infection.

References

External links

Official website

People educated at Harrow School
People educated at Brighton College
People educated at Kelly College
Alumni of SOAS University of London
1960 births
Nigerian Christians
Nigerian male poets
Federal ministers of Nigeria
Aviation ministers of Nigeria
Nigerian ministers of tourism, culture and natural orientation
20th-century Nigerian lawyers
Living people
Alumni of Pembroke College, Cambridge
National Democratic Coalition (Nigeria) politicians
Peoples Democratic Party (Nigeria) politicians
People from Osun State
People educated at Holmewood House School
Politicians from Lagos
Yoruba politicians
Femi
21st-century Nigerian poets
21st-century Nigerian politicians